The following outline is provided as an overview of and topical guide to black holes:

Black hole – mathematically defined region of spacetime exhibiting such a strong gravitational pull that no particle or electromagnetic radiation can escape from inside it. The theory of general relativity predicts that a sufficiently compact mass can deform spacetime to form a black hole. The boundary of the region from which no escape is possible is called the event horizon. Although crossing the event horizon has enormous effect on the fate of the object crossing it, it appears to have no locally detectable features. In many ways a black hole acts like an ideal black body, as it reflects no light. Moreover, quantum field theory in curved spacetime predicts that event horizons emit Hawking radiation, with the same spectrum as a black body of a temperature inversely proportional to its mass. This temperature is on the order of billionths of a kelvin for black holes of stellar mass, making it essentially impossible to observe.

What type of thing is a black hole? 
A black hole can be described as all of the following:

 Astronomical object
 Black body
 Collapsed star

Types of black holes   
 Schwarzschild metric  – In Einstein's theory of general relativity, the Schwarzschild solution, named after Karl Schwarzschild, describes the gravitational field outside a spherical, uncharged, non-rotating mass such as a  star, planet, or black hole.  
 Rotating black hole  – black hole that possesses spin angular momentum. 
 Charged black hole  – black hole that possesses electric charge.  
 Virtual black hole  – black hole that exists temporarily as a result of a quantum fluctuation of spacetime.

Types of black holes, by size   
 Micro black hole – predicted as tiny black holes, also called quantum mechanical black holes, or mini black holes, for which quantum mechanical effects play an important role.  These could potentially have arisen as primordial black holes.
 Extremal black hole – black hole with the minimal possible mass that can be compatible with a given charge and angular momentum. 
 Black hole electron – if there were a black hole with the same mass and charge as an electron, it would share many of the properties of the electron including the magnetic moment and Compton wavelength.  
 Stellar black hole – black hole formed by the gravitational collapse of a massive star.  They have masses ranging from about three to several tens of solar masses.
 Intermediate-mass black hole – black hole whose mass is significantly more than stellar black holes  yet far less than supermassive black holes.
 Supermassive black hole – largest type of black hole in a galaxy, on the order of hundreds of thousands to billions of solar masses.  
 Quasar – very energetic and distant active galactic nucleus.  
 Active galactic nucleus – compact region at the centre of a galaxy that has a much higher than normal luminosity over at least some portion, and possibly all, of the electromagnetic spectrum.  
 Blazar – very compact quasar  associated with a presumed supermassive black hole at the center of an active, giant elliptical galaxy.

Specific black holes 

 List of black holes  – incomplete list of black holes organized by size; some items in this list are galaxies or star clusters that are believed to be organized around a black hole.

Black hole exploration 

 Rossi X-ray Timing Explorer  – satellite that observes the time structure of astronomical X-ray sources, named after Bruno Rossi.

Formation of black holes 
 
 Stellar evolution  – process by which a star undergoes a sequence of radical changes during its lifetime.  
 Gravitational collapse  – inward fall of a body due to the influence of its own  gravity.  
 Neutron star  – type of stellar remnant that can result from the gravitational collapse of a massive star during a Type II, Type Ib or Type Ic supernova event.  
 Compact star  – white dwarfs, neutron stars, other exotic dense stars, and black holes.  
 Quark star  – hypothetical type of exotic star composed of quark matter, or strange matter.  
 Exotic star  – compact star composed of something other than electrons, protons, and neutrons balanced against gravitational collapse by degeneracy pressure or other quantum properties.  
 Tolman–Oppenheimer–Volkoff limit  – upper bound to the mass of stars composed of neutron-degenerate matter.
 White dwarf  – also called a degenerate dwarf, is a small star composed mostly of electron-degenerate matter.  
 Supernova  –  stellar explosion that is more energetic than a nova.  
 Hypernova  –  also known as a Type Ic Supernova, refers to an immensely large star that collapses at the end of its lifespan.
 Gamma-ray burst  – flashes of gamma rays associated with extremely energetic explosions that have been observed in distant galaxies.

Properties of black holes 

 Accretion disk – structure (often a circumstellar disk) formed by diffused material in orbital motion around a massive central body, typically a star. Accretion disks of black holes radiate in the X-ray part of the spectrum.
 Black hole thermodynamics  –  area of study that seeks to reconcile the laws of thermodynamics with the existence of black hole event horizons.  
 Schwarzschild radius  –  distance from the center of an object such that, if all the mass of the object were compressed within that sphere, the escape speed from the surface would equal the speed of light.  
 M–sigma relation  – empirical correlation between the stellar velocity dispersion  of a galaxy bulge and the mass M of the supermassive black hole at  
 Event horizon  – boundary in spacetime beyond which events cannot affect an outside observer.  
 Quasi-periodic oscillation  – manner in which the X-ray light from an astronomical object flickers about certain frequencies.  
 Photon sphere  – spherical region of space where gravity is strong enough that photons are forced to travel in orbits.  
 Ergosphere  –  region located outside a rotating black hole.  
 Hawking radiation  –  black-body radiation that is predicted to be emitted by black holes, due to quantum effects near the event horizon.  
 Penrose process  – process theorised by Roger Penrose wherein energy can be extracted from a rotating black hole.  
 Bondi accretion  – spherical accretion onto an object.  
 Spaghettification  –  vertical stretching and horizontal compression of objects into long thin shapes  in a very strong gravitational field, and is caused by extreme tidal forces.  
 Gravitational lens  – distribution of matter  between a distant source  and an observer, that is capable of bending  the light from the source, as it travels towards the observer.

History of black holes 

History of black holes
 Timeline of black hole physics  – Timeline of black hole physics 
 John Michell – geologist who first proposed the idea "dark stars" in 1783
 Dark star
 Pierre-Simon Laplace – early mathematical theorist (1796) of the idea of black holes
 Albert Einstein – in 1915, arrived at the theory of general relativity
 Karl Schwarzschild – described the gravitational field of a point mass in 1915
 Subrahmanyan Chandrasekhar – in 1931, using special relativity, postulated that a non-rotating body of electron-degenerate matter above a certain limiting mass (now called the Chandrasekhar limit at 1.4 solar masses) has no stable solutions.
 David Finkelstein – identified the Schwarzschild surface as an event horizon
 Roy Kerr –  In 1963, found the exact solution for a rotating black hole

Models of black holes 

 Gravitational singularity  – or spacetime singularity is a location where the quantities that are used to measure the gravitational field become infinite in a way that does not depend on the coordinate system.  
 Penrose–Hawking singularity theorems  – set of results in general relativity which attempt to answer the question of when gravitation produces singularities. 
 Primordial black hole  – hypothetical type of black hole that is formed not by the gravitational collapse of a large star but by the extreme density of matter present during the universe's early expansion.  
 Gravastar  – object hypothesized in astrophysics as an alternative to the black hole theory by Pawel Mazur and Emil Mottola.  
 Dark star (Newtonian mechanics)  – theoretical object compatible with Newtonian mechanics that, due to its large mass, has a surface escape velocity that equals or exceeds the speed of light.  
 Dark-energy star 
 Black star (semiclassical gravity)  – gravitational object composed of matter.  
 Magnetospheric eternally collapsing object  – proposed alternatives to black holes advocated by Darryl Leiter and Stanley Robertson. 
 Fuzzball (string theory)  – theorized by some superstring theory scientists to be the true quantum description of black holes.  
 White hole  – hypothetical region of spacetime which cannot be entered from the outside, but from which matter and light have the ability to escape.  
 Naked singularity  – gravitational singularity without an event horizon.  
 Ring singularity  –  describes the altering gravitational singularity of a rotating black hole, or a Kerr black hole, so that the gravitational singularity becomes shaped like a ring. 
 Immirzi parameter  – numerical coefficient appearing in loop quantum gravity, a nonperturbative theory of quantum gravity.  
 Membrane paradigm  – useful "toy model" method or "engineering approach" for visualising and calculating the effects predicted by quantum mechanics for the exterior physics of black holes, without using quantum-mechanical principles or calculations.  
 Kugelblitz (astrophysics)  – concentration of light so intense that it forms an event horizon and becomes self-trapped: according to general relativity, if enough radiation is aimed into a region, the concentration of energy can warp spacetime enough for the region to become a black hole.
 Wormhole  – hypothetical topological feature of spacetime that would be, fundamentally, a "shortcut" through spacetime.  
 Quasi-star  –  hypothetical type of extremely massive star that may have existed very early in the history of the Universe.
 Black hole neural network

Issues pertaining to black holes 

 No-hair theorem  – postulates that all black hole solutions of the Einstein-Maxwell equations of gravitation and electromagnetism in general relativity can be completely characterized by only three externally observable classical parameters: mass, electric charge, and angular momentum.  
 Black hole information paradox  –  results from the combination of quantum mechanics and general relativity.  
 Cosmic censorship hypothesis  – two mathematical conjectures about the structure of singularities arising in general relativity. 
 Nonsingular black hole models  – mathematical theory of black holes that avoids certain theoretical problems with the standard black hole model, including information loss and the unobservable nature of the black hole event horizon. 
 Holographic principle  –  property of quantum gravity and string theories which states that the description of a volume of space can be thought of as encoded on a boundary to the region—preferably a light-like boundary like a gravitational horizon.  
 Black hole complementarity  –  conjectured solution to the black hole information paradox, proposed by Leonard Susskind and Gerard 't Hooft.

Black hole metrics 
  
 Schwarzschild metric  – describes the gravitational field outside a spherical, uncharged, non-rotating mass such as a  star, planet, or black hole.  
 Kerr metric  – describes the geometry of empty spacetime around an uncharged, rotating black hole (axially symmetric with an event horizon which is topologically a sphere) 
 Reissner–Nordström metric  – static solution to the Einstein-Maxwell field equations, which corresponds to the gravitational field of a charged, non-rotating, spherically symmetric body of mass M. 
 Kerr-Newman metric  – solution of the Einstein–Maxwell equations in general relativity, describing the spacetime geometry in the region surrounding a charged, rotating mass.

Astronomical objects including a black hole 

 Hypercompact stellar system  – dense cluster of stars around a supermassive black hole that has been ejected from the centre of its host galaxy.

Persons influential in black hole research 
 Stephen Hawking

See also 

 Outline of astronomy
 Outline of space science

References

External links 

 
 Stanford Encyclopedia of Philosophy: "Singularities and Black Holes" by Erik Curiel and Peter Bokulich.
 Black Holes: Gravity's Relentless Pull—Interactive multimedia Web site about the physics and astronomy of black holes from the Space Telescope Science Institute
 Frequently Asked Questions (FAQs) on Black Holes
 "Schwarzschild Geometry"
Videos
 16-year-long study tracks stars orbiting Milky Way black hole
 Movie of Black Hole Candidate from Max Planck Institute
 Nature.com 2015-04-20 3D simulations of colliding black holes
 Computer visualisation of the signal detected by LIGO
 Two Black Holes Merge into One (based upon the signal GW150914

Black hole
Black hole

Black holes, Outline
Black holes, Outine